Stefan Winter is a Canadian historian specialising in the study of Ottoman Syria. He teaches at both the Université du Québec à Montréal and Koç University in Istanbul. His research concentrates on Shi‘i, Bedouin and Kurdish principalities in northern Syria and southern Anatolia and has been published by Cambridge University Press, Princeton University Press and in a number of academic journals. His work won the Syrian Studies Association's prize for best dissertation in 2002 and the Ottoman and Turkish Studies Association's Fuat Köprülü Award in 2017.

Education
Born into a German-speaking family established in Québec since 1970, Stefan Winter completed his school education with a Diplôme d’études collégiales (DEC) in Commerce at CÉGEP St.-Lawrence in Sainte-Foy before studying at the University of Toronto (BA, Middle East and Islamic Studies, 1994), Universität Erlangen (MA, Political Science, 1996), the Institut français d’études arabes in Damascus, Bilkent University in Ankara, and the University of Chicago (PhD, History, 2002).

Teaching
Stefan Winter has been professor of history (professeur régulier, Département d’histoire) at the Université du Québec à Montréal (UQÀM) since 2004. He also served as director of the Groupe d’études turques et ottomanes (GÉTO) from 2006 to 2018. He was invited professor (Directeur d’études invité) at the École pratique des hautes études (EPHE) in 2007 and at the École des hautes études en sciences sociales (EHESS) in Paris in 2012 and 2018. In 2014-15 he was associate researcher at the History Department of Bilkent University in Ankara. He has been visiting professor of history at Koç University since 2018.

Research
Stefan Winter's research revolves around Ottoman policies toward rural and tribal communities in the Syrian-Lebanese-southern Anatolian hinterland, where he takes an essentially Marxian approach to show how the rise and expansion of native elites depended on their co-optation by the Ottoman state under the twin impulse of European colonialism and Ottoman administrative reform, rather than on their sectarian or ethnic identities. His work has been funded by the Fonds québécois de la recherche sur la société et la culture (FQRSC), the Social Sciences and Humanities Research Council (SSHRC) of Canada and the Scientific and Technological Research Council of Turkey (TÜBİTAK).

Main publications
 The Shiites of Lebanon under Ottoman Rule, 1516-1788 (Cambridge University Press, 2010) 
 A History of the ‘Alawis: From Medieval Syria to the Turkish Republic (Princeton University Press, 2016) 
 (edited with Mafalda Ade) Aleppo and its Hinterland in the Ottoman Period / Alep et sa province à l’époque ottomane (E.J. Brill, 2019) 
 Rural Society in Western Syria in the Early Modern Period (The Isis Press, Istanbul, 2022) 

Journal articles: https://uqam.academia.edu/GETO/

References 

Living people
1970 births
People from Montreal
University of Chicago alumni
University of Toronto alumni
University of Freiburg alumni